Wendelin is an unincorporated community in Clay County, Illinois, United States. Wendelin is northeast of Sailor Springs.  Wendelin is home of Holy Cross Catholic Church, and Vic's Tavern.

References

Unincorporated communities in Clay County, Illinois
Unincorporated communities in Illinois